Well Done Baby is a 2021 Indian Marathi language drama film directed by Priyanka Tanwar and produced under Anand Pandit Motion Pictures, Goosebumps Entertainment and The Production Headquarters. The film stars Pushkar Jog, Amruta Khanvilkar, Vandana Gupte and Sanjay Jadhav. Music by Rohan-Rohan. 

The film was released on OTT Amazon Prime Video 9 April 2021 and re-release theatrical on 14 January 2022.

Synopsis 
Aditya and Meera, a modern couple, struggle to keep their marriage afloat. However, as they are about to give up on each other, fate gives them a purpose to maintain their togetherness.

Cast
 Pushkar Jog as Aditya 
 Amruta Khanvilkar as Meera
 Vandana Gupte as Nirmala 
 Sanjay Jadhav as Marriage councillor
 Sonali Khare as Doctor Simone
 Rahul Awasthi as Aditya's Father
 Radhika Ingle as Aditya's Mother
 Neha Shitole as Doctor
 Suan-Li Ong as Joanna
 Ranjna Garg as Mayura
 Vladimir Mladenov Free-Man as Homeless Begger
 Henrietta Szentes as Emma
 Pradeep Shembekhar
 Bhushan Telang
 Archana Malu Tapuria as Archana

Production 
The film was announced on 8 October 2019 via a promotional poster, with official confirmation that film actor Pushkar Jog. Principal photography began on 21 October 2019 in London. On 11 November 2019, entire shooting of the film has been wrapped up.

Soundtrack

Critical reception 
Well Done Baby film received negative reviews from critics. Mihir Bhanage of The Times of India gave the film 2.5 stars out of 5 and wrote "Well Done Baby ultimately ends up being a film that could've been in sync with the young viewers' perception". Shefali Deshpande of The Quint gave the film 1.5 stars out of 5 and  wrote "This film fails for many reasons, and it pains me to even say so because the treatment of the subject and characters both makes it clear that the intention was good but the delivery leaves a lot to be desired". Keyur Seta of Cinestaan.com gave the film 2 stars out of 5 and says "Amruta Khanwilkar is adequate but Pushkar Jog, who is credited with the concept for the film, is a disappointment, particularly in the important scene where he has an emotional outburst.". Jaideep Pathakji of Maharashtra Times gave the film 2.5 stars out of 5 and wrote "Of course, there is nothing new about these topics because they come up frequently in the contemporary media. 'Well Done Baby' is definitely worth a watch. However, the fact remains that it does not show anything different".

References

External links
 

2021 films
2020s Marathi-language films
Indian drama films
Films not released in theaters due to the COVID-19 pandemic
2021 direct-to-video films